Linthoingambi "Lin" Laishram is an Indian model, actress and businesswoman from Manipur. She was discovered by Elite modelling agency Mumbai, India where she was a regular at fashion events like the India Fashion week, New York Bridal week and is  seen on print and TVCs in India and elsewhere.

Career
Laishram first appeared in a cameo in Om Shanti Om. She was the brand ambassador of New York based jewellery brand, Ozoru Jewelry. She represented her state in Miss North East and was the first runner up in 2008 held in Shillong. She went on to participate in the reality TV show Kingfisher calendar girl where she won many hearts with her exotic looks and athletic body. She is also the first Manipuri model who went on national television wearing a swimsuit, which led to many controversies in her hometown.

Laishram lived in New York; where she was a print and Fashion model and worked with many renowned photographers; make-up artistes and stylist.

She studied at New York Stella Adler the art of acting school while she was modelling in New York city. She headed back to Bombay and spent 3 years doing theatre with Motley by Naseeruddin Shah; Pravah theatre Lab by Neeraj Kabi; and Rangbaaz. Where she went on to perform in Bombay’s famous theatres like Prithvi theatre; NCPA and travelled with the productions.

She played the character of Bembem in the 2014 National award winning movie Mary Kom alongside Priyanka Chopra and directed by Omung Kumar. She acted in a short film directed by Kenny Basumatary as well as in the Indie film Umrika directed by Prashant Nair playing a Nepali girl opposite Prateik Babbar. Lin played the character Mema in the period romantic drama Rangoon directed by Vishal Bhardwaj starring Kangana Shahid Kapoor and Saif Ali Khan.

Laishram is trained archer from Tata Archery academy in Jamshedpur, and was a Junior National Champion in 1998 Nationals held in Chandigarh.

She started her jewellery line called Shamooo Sana in March 2017.

Filmography
Om Shanti Om (2007) cameo appearance as Om Kapoor's Friend 
Mary Kom (2014) as Bem-Bem
Umrika (2015) as Udai's Wife
Rangoon (2017) as Mema
Axone (2019) as Chanbi
Ave Maria (2020) as Susan (short film)

Laishram has also done a cameo in Hattrick. She played a small part in the Vishal Bharadwaj film, Matru Ki Bijlee Ka Mandola.

References

External links
 
 

Living people
1985 births
People from Imphal
Indian film actresses
Female models from Manipur
Actresses from Manipur
Actresses in Meitei cinema
Actresses in Hindi cinema
21st-century Indian actresses